The Maonan language is a Kam–Sui language spoken mainly in China by the Maonan people, specifically in northern Guangxi and southern Guizhou. Huanjiang Maonan Autonomous County, Hechi, northern Guangxi, holds a concentrated number of speakers.

Demographics
Approximately half of all Maonan people are capable of speaking Maonan. In addition to this, many Maonan also speak Chinese or a Zhuang language. About 1/3 of all people who self-identify as Maonan are concentrated in the southern Guizhou province. They speak a mutually unintelligible dialect commonly called Yanghuang, which is more commonly known as the Then language in Western literature. The Maonan do not have a writing system.

Other than Huanjiang Maonan Autonomous County in Guangxi, Maonan is also spoken in the following locations.

Nandan County, Guangxi
Du'an Yao Autonomous County, Guangxi
Yizhou, Guangxi
Libo County, Guizhou
Pingtang County, Guizhou

Phonology
Maonan is a tonal language with 8 tones (Lu 2008:90–91), featuring an SVO clause construction (Lu 2008:169). (See Proto-Tai language#Tones for an explanation of the tone numbers.) For example:

Syntax
Maonan displays a head-first modification structure, i.e. the modifier occurring after the word being modified (Lu 2008:170). For example:

Occasionally, a head-final modification structure is also possible with the involvement of a possessive particle (P.P.) ti5. For example:

(cf. the more common bo4 jaːn1 ndaːu1) (Lu 2008:173-174).

Writing system
The Maonan writing system was established in 2010. It is based on 26 Latin letters to facilitate standard keyboard input. The letters z, j, x, s, h are attached to the end of each syllable as tonal markers, representing tones 2, 3, 4, 5, 6 respectively. The first tone is not written. Syllables ending in -b, -d, -g, -p, -t, -k do not distinguish tone either. The writing system is being used among a limited number of Maonan intellectuals. For example:

See also
 Maonan people

Further reading

References

External links
 Maonan.info by Lu Tianqiao

Languages of China
Kam–Sui languages
Guangxi